Beach Volleyball at the 2018 Summer Youth Olympics was held from 7 to 17 October. The events took place at the Parque Tres de Febrero in Buenos Aires, Argentina.

Qualification

A total of 32 teams will participate in each gender. Each National Olympic Committee (NOC) can enter a maximum of 2 teams of 2 athletes, 1 per each gender. As hosts, Argentina was given the maximum quota and a further 10 teams, 5 in each gender will be decided by the Tripartite Commission. The remaining quotas were to be decided at the 2018 Beach Volleyball U19 World Championship and qualifiers decided by the five continental regions. The U19 World Championship will have priority over the continental qualifiers. Each region is allocated five teams per gender, however there must by 50% participation for the continent to be given the complete quota, if not the quotas will be reduced.

Only athletes born between 1 January 2000 and 31 December 2003 were eligible to participate in the 2018 Youth Olympics.

Boys

Girls

Medal summary

Medal table

Events

References

External links
Official Results Book – Beach volleyball

 
2018 Summer Youth Olympics events
Youth Summer Olympics
International volleyball competitions hosted by Argentina
Beach volleyball at the Youth Olympics